Nea Genea ("New Generation") was a destroyer that served in the Royal Hellenic Navy from 1912–1919.  She was originally the German destroyer V-6.

Service 

The ship, along with one of her six sister ships of V-class destroyers, was ordered from Germany.  They were purchased before entering service in the German Navy, from the German shipyard Vulcan AG in Stettin, when the Balkan Wars were underway. 
 
Later, during World War I, Greece belatedly entered the war on the side of the Triple Entente and, due to Greece's neutrality the two ex-German V-class ships were seized by the Allies in October 1916, taken over by the French in November and served in the French Navy from 1917–18. By 1918, they were back on escort duty under Greek colors, mainly in the Aegean Sea.

Nea Genea was stricken in 1919 and scrapped in 1922.

See also
History of the Hellenic Navy

External links
  Russian Naval Encyclopedia
  Greek Naval ships of World War I

1912 ships
V1-class destroyers of the Hellenic Navy
Military units and formations of Greece in the Balkan Wars
Ships built in Stettin
World War I destroyers of France
World War I destroyers of Greece